Precis frobeniusi, the toothed commodore, is a butterfly in the family Nymphalidae. It is found in Guinea, Sierra Leone, Liberia and northern Nigeria. The habitat consists of stream beds in dry, hilly areas in savanna.

References

Butterflies described in 1909
Junoniini